The Diocese of Ploaghe (Latin: Dioecesis Plovacensis) was a Roman Catholic diocese located in the town of Ploaghe in the Province of Sassari in the Italian region Sardinia. In 1503, it was suppressed.

Ordinaries

Diocese of Ploaghe
Erected: 1090
Latin Name: Plovacensis

Pere de Portell, O.P. (28 Feb 1328 Ordained – )
...
Nicolò Basone (14 Jun 1447 – 1475 Died)
Basilio Gambone (15 Mar 1476 – 1488 Died)
Bartolomeo Pathos (27 Aug 1488 – 1495 Died)
Giovanni Cardona, O.S.A. (13 Feb 1495 Appointed – )

Suppressed: 1503

See also
Catholic Church in Italy

References

Former Roman Catholic dioceses in Italy